Richard Henry Searle (16 January 1934 – 12 October 2010) is a former Queensland cricketer, a left-arm fast-medium bowler who made one first class cricket appearance during the 1954/55 season. He took four wickets for 83 in his only innings with the ball and scored no runs with the bat, during a match against New South Wales on 1 January 1955. Outside of first-class cricket, he also played a handful of matches for the Queensland Colts, and went on to play for Australian Capital Territory between 1959 and 1963.

Notes

External links

1934 births
Living people
Queensland cricketers
Cricketers from Brisbane
Australian cricketers